Wandsworth Common railway station is in the London Borough of Wandsworth in south London.

The station and all trains serving it are operated by Southern, and it is in Travelcard Zone 3.

History

The West End of London and Crystal Palace Railway (WELCR) opened the first station as Wandsworth slightly to the north of the present station on 1 December 1856. From the outset the line was worked by the London, Brighton and South Coast Railway (LB&SCR), and then only ran to and from Crystal Palace. There were plans to extend it to join with the London and South Western Railway (L&SWR) main line nearby, thereby providing access to London Waterloo station, but these were rejected by that railway. It was renamed Wandsworth Common on 1 January 1858 before closing later that year on 1 June 1858. It was replaced by a station named New Wandsworth which had opened on 29 March 1858 when the (WELCR) extended its line to Pimlico, and it was purchased by the LB&SCR.

The station at New Wandsworth was closed when the present Wandsworth Common was opened at its current location by the LB&SCR on 1 November 1869 as part of works to widen the line, and improve the route between East Croydon and Victoria.
Further remodelling of the line was undertaken in 1890 to increase capacity.

The lines through the station to Crystal Palace were electrified on 12 May 1911, by means of the LB&SCR 'Elevated Electric' overhead system. Work on electrifying the remaining services through the station had begun in 1913 but was interrupted by the First World War and not completed until 1925. By this time the LB&SCR was absorbed into the Southern Railway following the 1921 Railways Act.

In 1925 the Southern Railway decided to adopt a third rail electrification system and the lines through the station were converted between June 1928 and September 1929.

When sectorisation was introduced in the 1980s, the national rail lines were served by Network SouthEast until the privatisation of the British Railways.

Upon privatisation in the 1990s, the national rail lines came under the Connex South Central franchise, which was replaced by the current operator in 2000.

On 10 March 1992 a Provisional IRA bomb by the station damaged trackside equipment.

Services 
All services at Wandsworth Common are operated by Southern using  EMUs.

The typical off-peak service in trains per hour is:
 4 tph to 
 2 tph to  via 
 2 tph to  via 

Connections
London Buses routes 319 and G1 serve the station.

See also 
Wandsworth Town railway station

References

External links 

Wandsworth Common and the Surrounding Area

Railway stations in the London Borough of Wandsworth
Former London, Brighton and South Coast Railway stations
Railway stations in Great Britain opened in 1856
Railway stations in Great Britain closed in 1858
Railway stations in Great Britain opened in 1869
Railway stations served by Govia Thameslink Railway
1869 establishments in England